Tallawong is a suburb of Blacktown in the state of New South Wales, Australia. Tallawong is in north-west Greater Sydney Area in the local government area of Blacktown. It is named after the metro station located within its boundaries, which opened in May 2019. Tallawong is a Darug word meaning apple gum tree.

History
The majority of the suburb used to be part of Schofields. However, Tallawong station in the southeast is located in what used to be part of Rouse Hill. Until the creation of the suburb of Tallawong, there were two metro stations within the suburb of Rouse Hill, the other being Rouse Hill station.

Tallawong was gazetted on 6 November 2020.

Transport
Tallawong metro station, opened in May 2019, is located in the southeast portion of the suburb between Tallawong Road and Cudgegong Road. It is the terminus of the Metro North West Line which provides high frequency rail services to Chatswood.

Bus stops are located outside the metro station on Implexa Parade. They are serviced by Busways routes 732, 742, 747 and 751 to Rouse Hil, Marsden Park, Riverstone and Blacktown and Hillsbus night route 607N to Queen Victoria Building in the City. Nightride bus route N92 operates between Tallawong and Sydney central business district outside metro operation hours.

References

External links
Map of Tallawong (November 2020) – Blacktown City Council

Suburbs of Sydney
City of Blacktown